Sophia Julia Coleman Douglas (1851–1902) was the founder and first president of the Federation of Women's Clubs for Oklahoma and Indian Territories. She served as principal of Oklahoma City High School before statehood.

Biography
Douglas née Coleman was born on September 22, 1851 in Cattaraugus County, New York. Her family moved to Michigan with her when she was eight years old, where she attended the state normal school. She attended Vassar College. In 1869 she married a judge, Selwyn Douglas (1841-1916), with whom she had one child, MacGregor Coleman (1873–1908).

In 1891 the Colemans moved to Oklahoma City, Oklahoma. There Mrs. Douglas was the principal of the city's first high school.

Coleman was a member of several women's clubs. She joined the Philomathea Club in 1891. The Philomathea Club worked to obtain funds for a Carnegie Library in Oklahoma City. Colman wrote a letter to Andrew Carnegie in 1900 requesting a grant for the library, which he provided.  In 1896 she formed the Sans Souci study club, in 1898 the Twentieth Century Club, in 1900 the New Century Club, and in 1901 the DAYC Club (Do All You Can).

In 1898, working with the Philomathea Club, Douglas founded the Federation of Women's Clubs for Oklahoma and Indian Territories. She also served as its first president.

Douglas died on August 8, 1902 in Oklahoma City.

Legacy
A memorial fountain was erected with funds donated by the Federation of Women's Clubs for Oklahoma and Indian Territories on the grounds of the Oklahoma City Carnegie Library. It was presented November, 1903.

References

1851 births
1902 deaths
People from Oklahoma City
Clubwomen